The Very Best of Me is a collection of material that Jean Knight recorded for Aim Records in 1994, which includes rerecordings of her biggest hits "Mr. Big Stuff" and "My Toot Toot" and covers of "Make Me Yours" and "Trapped by Love." It was produced by Knight and her long-time collaborators Isaac Bolden and Carl Marshall. This album also includes the original version of her 1981 hit "You Got the Papers but I Got the Man." The inside album cover includes a personal message from Knight that includes her thanks and a short biography of her life and career that was written by Jeff Hannusch.

Track listing
 "Mr. Big Stuff" (Joe Broussard, Ralph Williams, Carrol Washington) - 2:30
 "Cleanup Woman" (Clarence Reid, Willie Clarke) - 2:59
 "If It Don't Fit, Don't Force It" (Carolyn Johns, Larry Farrow) - 3:56
 "Precious, Precious" (Dave Crawford, Jackie Moore) - 3:45
 "Make Me Yours" (Betty Swan) - 3:17
 "I Like What You Are Doing to Me" (Bettye Crutcher, Homer Banks, Raymond Jackson) - 3:21
 "Trapped by Love" (Denise LaSalle) - 2:57
 "My Toot Toot" (Sidney Simien) - 4:39
 "You Got the Papers but I Got the Man" (J. Harris, Isaac Bolden) - 4:19
 "I'd Rather Go Blind" (Ellington Jordan, Billy Foster) - 3:30
 "Rocking Chair" (Clarence Reid, Willie Clarke) - 3:44

Album credits
Producers: Jean Knight, Isaac Bolden, and Carl Marshall
Associate producers: Jean Knight, Isaac Bolden, and Carl Marshall
Recording studio: Gift Recording Studio/New Orleans, LA

Jean Knight albums
1997 compilation albums